Mary Mancini is an American political activist and former candidate, who served as Chair of the Tennessee Democratic Party from 2015 to 2021. She was elected as Chair of the Tennessee Democratic Party on January 10, 2015 as the second woman to be elected to that position  and was re-elected to a second two-year term  in January 2017 and a third in January 2019. She was a candidate for Tennessee State Senate District 21 and lost in the 2014 Democratic primary to Jeff Yarbro. She had previously served as Executive Director of Tennessee Citizen Action, an advocacy and grassroots organizing group based in Nashville. She also was the co-host of Liberadio with Mary Mancini and Freddie O’Connell, a liberal radio show. From 1992 to 1998 she was the owner of Lucy's Record Shop.

Personal life

Mary Mancini is married to Nashville musician Kurt Wagner of the band Lambchop.

References

Living people
Syracuse University alumni
Tennessee Democratic Party chairs
Tennessee Democrats
Women in Tennessee politics
Year of birth missing (living people)